Stefan Balmazović (born May 28, 1989) is a Serbian professional basketball player for Borac Zemun of the Second Basketball League of Serbia.

Balmazović joined Borac Zemun of the Second Basketball League of Serbia in 2021, and averaged 18 points, 4.9 rebounds, 1.9 assists and 1.8 steals per game. On March 1, 2022, he signed with Rabotnički.

References

External links
 Stefan Balmazović at realgm.com
 Stefan Balmazović at eurobasket.com
 Stefan Balmazović at proballers.com

1989 births
Living people
ABA League players
Basketball League of Serbia players
Small forwards
KK Borac Zemun players
KK Crvena zvezda players
KK Metalac Valjevo players
KK Mega Basket players
KK Mladost Zemun players
KK Radnički Kragujevac (2009–2014) players
KK Spartak Subotica players
KK Vizura players
KK Vršac players
People from Ivanjica
Serbian men's basketball players
Serbian expatriate basketball people in North Macedonia
Serbian expatriate basketball people in Poland
Serbian expatriate basketball people in Hungary